The 2004–05 WWHL season  was the first season of the Western Women's Hockey League. Previously this league did not exist and the western teams were in a division of the  National Women's Hockey League.

Final standings
Note: GP = Games played, W = Wins, L = Losses, T = Ties, GF = Goals for, GA = Goals against, Pts = Points.

Playoffs

Final round: Calgary Oval X-Treme vs Edmonton Chimos in Calgary, Alberta
 Calgary Oval X-Treme win the WWHL Champions cup

Scoring Leaders

Goalie Leaders

References

External links
   Western Women's Hockey League

Western Women's Hockey League seasons
WWHL